The 1996 Speedway Grand Prix of Sweden was the fourth race of the 1996 Speedway Grand Prix season. It took place on 10 August in the Motorstadium in Linköping, Sweden It was the second Swedish SGP and was won by American rider Billy Hamill. It was the second win of his career.

Starting positions draw 

  (11) Tommy Knudsen
  (14) Gary Havelock
 both was replaced by track reserve
Draw 17. track reserve →  (20) Jan Stæchmann
Draw 18. track reserve →  (21) Mikael Karlsson
Tomasz Gollob (#19) also rode.

Heat details

The intermediate classification

See also 
 Speedway Grand Prix
 List of Speedway Grand Prix riders

References

External links 
 FIM-live.com
 SpeedwayWorld.tv

Speedway Grand Prix of Sweden
S
1996